Odo I (Eudes I), called “the Foolish” (fatuus), was the ruler of Saint-Simon. The last Carolingian male (from its branch Herbertines), he was the only son of Herbert IV, Count of Vermandois and Adele of Valois.

About 1077, Odo was disinherited. Odo was possibly mentally ill, since the Latin fatuus can mean Insane, Foolish, Stupid. In the council of barons took the power away from Odo and gave it to his sister, Adelaide, Countess of Vermandois, married to Hugh, son of Henry I of France.

The work Memoires de Saint-Simon continues the family tree forward.

References

Sources 
De Genere Comitum Flandrisium Notae Parisiensis, in MGH, 1881 https://archive.org/details/sim_monumenta-germaniae-historica_1881/page/256/mode/2up "Comes Herbertus genuit Odonem et Adelam sororem. Odo fuit fatuus et indiscretus. Barones Viromandenses rogaverunt regem, ut Adelam daret Hugoni le Magne, fratri eius- dem regis; quod factum est. Predictus vero Hugo dedit in uxorem fillam cuiusdam militis Viro[mandensis] predieto Odoni Fatuo. De Odone Fatuo et eius uxore exivit Odo Ferrarius, qui fuit pater lohannıs de Sancto Simone, qui adhuc vivit. De predicto comite Hugone et predicta Adela uxore sua exivit comes Radulfus, Simon Noviomensis episcopus, dominus Henricus de Chaumont et quatuor filie; de quibus quidam marchıo Lumbardie unam habuit, secundam® dominus Baugenciaci, tertiam comes Mellenti"

 Memoires de Saint-Simon by Saint-Simon, Louis de Rouvroy, duc de, 1675-1755; Boislisle, Arthur André Gabriel michel de, 1835-1908; Lecestre, Léon, 1861-; Boislisle, Jean Georges Léon Michel de, 1876-  https://archive.org/details/memoiresdesaints01sain/page/386/mode/2up

External Links
"Eudes fatuus", Medlands by Charles Cawley

Herbertien dynasty
11th-century births
11th-century deaths